The People's Supreme Court (Tribunal Supremo Popular) is the highest body of judicial power in Cuba. It is elected by, and accountable to, the National Assembly of People's Power. The judiciary are independent from the executive branch, as all judges on every level are elected by the National Assembly; the provincial judges by provincial assemblies and the municipal judges by municipal assemblies. The current court dates to 1973 and replaced the earlier Supreme Court of Cuba c. 1898.

Composition of Court

The People's Supreme Court is composed of a chief justice and president with his/her vice president and all professional and lay judges and is structured as follows: criminal, civil, administrative, labor, crimes-against-the-state, economic and military courts.

Presidents of the Supreme Court 
Antonio Ysidoro González de Mendoza Bonilla, 4.5.1899 – 25.9.1900
Rafael Félix De la Cruz Pérez, 25.9.1900 – 27.4.1904
Juan Bautista Hernández Barreyro, 5.9.1904 – 12.12.1913
José Antonio Pichardo Márquez, 17.12.1913 – 9.6.1917
José Antolín del Cueto Pazos, 9.6.1917 – 17.6.1921
Ángel Cirilo Betancourt Miranda, 21.6.1921 – 9.3.1925
Juan Manuel Gutiérrez Quirós, 7.5.1925 – 6.4.1932
José Gregorio Vivanco Hernández, 7.4.1932 – 19.8.1933
Juan Federico Edelmann Rovira, 19.8.1933 – 5.4.1952
Gabriel Emilio Pichardo Moya, 18.4.1952 – 27.7.1956
Santiago Desiderio Rosell Leyte-Vidal, 28.9.1956 – 13.1.1959
Emilio Florencio Menéndez Menéndez, 14.1.1959 – 21.12.1960
Enrique Armando Hart Ramírez, 2.2.1961 – 30.6.1980
José Raúl Amaro Salup, 1.7.1980 – 30.11.1998
Rubén Remigio Ferro, 23.12.1998 – 
Source:

See also

Cuban law

References

External Links
Tribunal Supremo Popular

Judiciary of Cuba